Michael Peter Fay (born May 30, 1975) is an American who was sentenced to six strokes of the cane in Singapore in 1994 for theft of road signs and vandalizing 18 cars over a ten-day period in September 1993, which caused a temporary strain in relations between Singapore and the United States. Fay pled guilty, but he later claimed that he was advised that such a plea would preclude caning and that his confession was false, that he never vandalized any cars, and that the only crime he committed was stealing road signs.

Although caning is a routine court sentence in Singapore, Fay's case garnered some controversy and was widely covered in the media in the United States, as it was believed to be the first judicial corporal punishment involving an American citizen. The number of cane strokes in Fay's sentence was ultimately reduced from six to four after United States officials requested leniency. He was caned on May 5, 1994.

Early life
Fay was born in St. Louis, Missouri. When he was eight, his mother Randy divorced his father George.  As a child, he was diagnosed with attention-deficit hyperactivity disorder (ADHD).
Although Fay mostly lived with his father after the divorce, he later moved to Singapore to live with his mother and stepfather, Marco Chan, and was enrolled in the Singapore American School in Woodlands.

Theft and vandalism in Singapore
In October 1993, The Straits Times, Singapore's main English-language newspaper, reported that car vandalism in Singapore was on the rise. Fay and his friends damaged their neighbors' cars at apartment blocks with hot tar, paint remover, red spray paint, and hatchets, and had eggs pelted at them. Taxi drivers complained that their tires were slashed. In the city center, cars were found with deep scratches and dents. One man complained that he had to refinish his car six times in six months.

The Singapore police eventually arrested 16-year-old Andy Shiu Chi Ho, a Chinese citizen from Hong Kong. He was not caught vandalizing cars, but was charged with driving his father's car without a license. After questioning Shiu, the police questioned several foreign students from the Singapore American School, including 18-year-old Fay, and charged them with more than 50 counts of vandalism. Fay pleaded guilty to vandalizing the cars in addition to stealing road signs. He later maintained that he had been advised such a plea would preclude caning and that his confession was false, that he never vandalized any cars, and that the only crime he committed was stealing signs.

Under the 1966 Vandalism Act, originally passed to curb the spread of political graffiti and which specifically penalized vandalism of government property, Fay was sentenced on March 3, 1994, to four months in jail, a fine of S$3,500 (US$2,814 or £2,114 at the time), and six strokes of the cane. Shiu, who pleaded not guilty, was sentenced to eight months in prison and 12 strokes of the cane.

Fay's lawyers appealed, arguing that the Vandalism Act provided caning only for indelible forms of graffiti vandalism, and that the damaged cars had been cheaply restored to their original condition.

Response

Public reaction
Following Fay's sentence, the case received coverage by the American, Singaporean and international media.

Some U.S. news outlets launched scathing attacks on Singapore's judicial system for what they considered an "archaic punishment", while others turned the issue into one of Singapore asserting "Asian values" towards "western decadence". The New York Times, The Washington Post and the Los Angeles Times ran editorials and op-eds condemning the punishment. USA Today reported that caning involved "bits of flesh flying with each stroke." It was claimed that the punishment had to be carried out by "trained warders holding high grades" in martial arts.

However, Singapore also found supporters among the foreign media and the American public; a survey of 23,000 people conducted by the National Polling Network (now merged with the Pew Research Center) found that up to 60% "favored whipping and other harsh sentences as an acceptable deterrent to crime in the USA". The support stemmed largely from an appreciation of Singapore's low-crime rate environment, and a belief that this was made possible by its strict laws. Some, including a number of U.S. legislators, even suggested that the U.S. could learn from Singapore and adopt caning in its sentences.

From the United States government
Despite the widespread endorsement among Americans, the Clinton administration ultimately expressed its objection to Singapore's decision to cane Fay. The official position of the United States government was that although it recognized Singapore's right to punish Fay within the due process of law, the punishment of caning was "excessive" for a teenager who committed a non-violent crime.

On March 3, the day the sentence was passed, Chargé d'Affaires Ralph Boyce at the United States Embassy in Singapore had also said that the punishment was too severe for the offence. The embassy claimed that, while the graffiti and physical damage to the cars was not permanent, caning could leave Fay with permanent physical scars.

Bill Clinton, the then President of the United States, also called Fay's punishment "extreme" and "mistaken", and pressured the Singapore government to grant Fay clemency from caning. Two dozen United States senators signed a letter to the Singapore government also appealing for clemency.

From the Singapore government
The Singapore government stood its ground and defended the sentence and the country's right to uphold its own laws. On March 3, in response to Boyce's comments on Fay's sentence, the Ministry of Home Affairs said that it was Singapore's tough laws that kept the country orderly and relatively crime-free, unlike "in cities like New York City, where even police cars are not spared the acts of vandals". Various Singaporean ministers also spoke publicly about the case throughout the episode. In April during a local television program, Lee Kuan Yew, then Senior Minister, said that the U.S. was neither safe nor peaceful because it did not dare to restrain or punish those who did wrong, adding, "If you like it this way, that is your problem. But, that is not the path we choose".

Nevertheless, on May 4 that year, the Singapore government via Ong Teng Cheong, then the country's President, announced that the number of cane strokes would be reduced from six to four out of consideration for President Clinton as it valued the good historical relations between both countries. Shiu's sentence was later also reduced, from 12 strokes to six, after a similar clemency appeal. Fay was caned on May 5, 1994, at the Queenstown Remand Centre.

Caning
Describing the caning day, Fay told Reuters that he did not know the time had come for punishment when he was taken from his cell. He said he was bent over a trestle so his buttocks stuck out, with his hands and feet buckled to the structure. He was naked except for a protective rubber pad fixed to his back. The flogger, a doctor, and prison officials were also present.

Fay told Reuters the caner walked sharply forward three steps to build power. "They go 'Count one'—you hear them yell it really loud—and a few seconds later they come, I guess I would call it charging at you with a rattan cane." He noted that a prison officer guided him through the ordeal saying: "OK Michael, three left; OK Michael, two left; OK one more, you're almost done." Fay reported that when the fourth stroke was delivered he was immediately unbuckled from the trestle and taken to a cell to recover. The caning, which Fay estimated took one minute, left a "few streaks of blood" running down his buttocks, and seven weeks later, left three dark-brown scar patches on his right buttock and four lines each about half-an-inch wide on his left buttock. He said that the wounds hurt for about five days after which they itched as they healed. "The first couple of days it was very hard to sit," Fay reported, but he said he was able to walk after the caning.

Aftermath 
After his release from prison in June 1994, Fay returned to the United States to live with his biological father. He gave several television interviews, including one with his American lawyer on CNN with Larry King on June 29, 1994, in which he admitted taking road signs but denied vandalizing cars. While he did not detail his experience, he claimed that he was "ill-treated" at times during questioning, but had shaken hands with the caning operative after his four strokes had been administered and the prison guards when he was released.

Several months after returning to the United States, Fay suffered burns to his hands and face after a butane incident. He was subsequently admitted to the Hazelden rehabilitation program for butane abuse. He claimed that sniffing butane "made [him] forget what happened in Singapore." In 1996, he was cited in Florida for a number of violations, including careless driving, reckless driving, not reporting a crash, and having an open bottle of alcohol in a car. Later, in 1998, still in Florida, Fay was arrested for possession of marijuana and drug paraphernalia, charges to which he confessed but was acquitted because of technical errors in his arrest.

During an interview with China's CCTV in June 2004, Lee Kuan Yew, then Senior Minister of Singapore, said that Fay assaulted his father upon his return to the United States, which was suppressed by the American media. In June 2010, Fay's case was recalled in international news, after another foreigner in Singapore, Swiss national Oliver Fricker, was sentenced to five months in jail and three strokes of the cane for trespassing a rail depot to vandalise a metro train that is a part of the country's Mass Rapid Transit.

In August 2018, a Singaporean news outlet reported that Fay was working as a casino manager in Cincinnati, Ohio.

In popular culture 
Season 19, episode 18 of Saturday Night Live cold-opened with a skit of Michael Fay's caning. The players included host Emilio Estevez as Fay, Kevin Nealon administering the caning, Rob Schneider as the warden, and Phil Hartman as the doctor.
In September 1994 "Weird Al" Yankovic released a song, "Headline News", which satirized the Fay case along with the Tonya Harding and Bobbitt stories.
The 1994 professional wrestling event When Worlds Collide promoted by Eastern Championship Wrestling featured a "Singapore canes" match with The Sandman (wrestler) and Tommy Dreamer, with the loser to receive ten strikes from a cane.
"Headwriter", a 1994 episode of The Larry Sanders Show opened with Sanders making a joke about Fay in the character's opening monologue: "Michael Fay is back in the U.S. from Singapore. And I can assure you, that is a long flight, especially when you have to stand the whole way."
Dr. Dre and Ice Cube referenced the caning in their 1994 single "Natural Born Killaz".
The case inspired a 1995 Simpsons episode, "Bart vs. Australia", in which Australia is to punish Bart via "booting"—a kick in the buttocks using a giant boot (later reduced to a shoe).

See also
 Oliver Fricker, who was sentenced to three strokes of the cane and seven months in jail in 2010 for a similar offence.

References

Further reading 
Latif, Asad (1994). The Flogging of Singapore: The Michael Fay Affair. Singapore: Times Books International. 
Baratham, Gopal (1994). The Caning of Michael Fay. Singapore: KRP Publication. 
Reyes, Alejandro (May 25, 1994). Rough Justice: A Caning in Singapore Stirs Up a Fierce Debate About Crime And Punishment, Asiaweek, Hong Kong.
The Asiaweek Newsmap (April 27, 1994). Asiaweek.
Chew, Valerie (August 5, 2009). "Michael Fay", Singapore Infopedia. National Library Board.

External links
The Singapore Government's response to the American Embassy's statement, April 1, 1994

1975 births
20th-century American criminals
American expatriates in Singapore
Caning in Singapore
Living people
People from St. Louis
Singapore–United States relations